State Road 570 (NM 570) is a  state highway in the US state of New Mexico. NM 570's southern terminus is at NM 68 in Pilar, and the northern terminus is at NM 68 in El Llano.

Major intersections

See also

References

570
Transportation in Taos County, New Mexico